SAFEEars!
Don't Lose The Music
It's a Noisy Planet
Healthy Youth!
Dangerous Decibels
Wise Ears!
HEARsmart

See also
Youth worker safety
Hearing loss
Hearing protection
Headphones

References

Lists of organizations
Child safety
Public health organizations
Health-related lists